Woodmore High School is a public high school in Elmore, Ohio, United States. It is the only high school in the Woodmore Local School District, which also serves Woodville, Ohio. Athletic teams are known as the Wildcats with school colors of navy blue and gold. They were founding members of the Suburban Lakes League in 1971, but joined the Northern Buckeye Conference in 2011. Woodmore was established in 1968 with the consolidation of Woodville High School and Harris-Elmore High School, and the school name is a portmanteau of the two community names.

State championships

 Boys golf – 1979, 1981
 Girls cross country – 1992, 1993, 1994
 Girls track and field – 1993

Notable alumni
 Terence T. Henricks, colonel in the United States Air Force and NASA astronaut with four Space Shuttle missions

References

External links
 

High schools in Ottawa County, Ohio
High schools in Sandusky County, Ohio
Public high schools in Ohio